Delias nysa, common name yellow-spotted jezebel (Australian subspecies), is a butterfly in the family Pieridae, described in 1775.  It is found in Australia (New South Wales, Queensland and Victoria), New Caledonia and Vanuatu. The wingspan is 50 mm.

The larvae feed on mistletoe species, including Amyema gaudichaudii, Korthalsella japonica, Korthalsella breviarticulata and Korthalsella rubra.

Subspecies
 Delias nysa nysa (Cairns to Wollongong)
 Delias nysa nivira Waterhouse & Lyell, 1914 (northern Queensland)
 Delias nysa caledonica Nieuwenhuis & Howarth, 1969 (New Caledonia)

References

External links
 Australian Insects
 Australian Faunal Directory

nysa
Butterflies described in 1775
Taxa named by Johan Christian Fabricius